Curdsville may refer to:

Curdsville, Kentucky, an unincorporated community in Daviess County
Curdsville, Virginia, an unincorporated community in Buckingham County